Gamini Amarasekera is a Sri Lankan judge appointed to the Supreme Court by the Constitutional Council on 9 January 2019.

References

Living people
Year of birth missing (living people)
Place of birth missing (living people)
Puisne Justices of the Supreme Court of Sri Lanka